1749 Telamon  is a dark Jupiter Trojan from the Greek camp, approximately  in diameter. It was discovered by German astronomer Karl Reinmuth at the Heidelberg Observatory on 23 September 1949, and named after Telamon from Greek mythology. The D-type asteroid is the principal body of the proposed Telamon family and belongs to the 60 largest Jupiter trojans. It has a rotation period of 17.0 hours and possibly a spherical shape.

Classification and orbit 

Telamon is a dark Jovian asteroid orbiting in the leading Greek camp at Jupiter's  Lagrangian point, 60° ahead of the Gas Giant's orbit in a 1:1 resonance (see Trojans in astronomy). It orbits the Sun at a distance of 4.6–5.7 AU once every 11 years and 8 months (4,268 days; semi-major axis of 5.15 AU). Its orbit has an eccentricity of 0.11 and an inclination of 6° with respect to the ecliptic.

Telamon family 

Fernando Roig and Ricardo Gil-Hutton identified Telamon as the principal body of a small Jovian asteroid family, using the hierarchical clustering method (HCM), which looks for groupings of neighboring asteroids based on the smallest distances between them in the proper orbital element space. According to the astronomers, the Telamon family belongs to the larger Menelaus clan, an aggregation of Jupiter trojans which is composed of several families, similar to the Flora family in the inner asteroid belt.

However this family is not included in David Nesvorný HCM-analysis from 2014. Instead, Telamon is listed as a non-family asteroid of the Jovian background population on the Asteroids Dynamic Site (AstDyS) which based on another analysis by Milani and Knežević.

Physical characteristics 

Telamon is a dark D-type asteroid according to the SDSS-based taxonomy and the surveys conducted by SMASS (Xu) and Pan-STARRS.

Diameter and albedo 

According to the surveys carried out by the Infrared Astronomical Satellite IRAS, the Japanese Akari satellite and NASA's Wide-field Infrared Survey Explorer with its subsequent NEOWISE mission, Telamon measures between 64.90 and 81.06 kilometers in diameter and its surface has an albedo between 0.046 and 0.078.

The Collaborative Asteroid Lightcurve Link derives an albedo of 0.0469 and a diameter of 80.91 kilometers based on an absolute magnitude of 9.4.

Lightcurves 

In October 2010, another observation by Robert Stephens at the Goat Mountain Astronomical Research Station  in California gave a period of 16.975 hours.

In August 2017, observations by the K2 mission of the Kepler spacecraft during Campaign 6 gave two periods of 11.331 and 22.613 hours with an amplitude of 0.06 and 0.07 magnitude, respectively. The body is possibly of spherical shape as all lightcurves measured a very small variation in brightness.

Naming 

This minor planet was named by the discoverer after Telamon, from Greek mythology, who was an argonaut searching for the Golden Fleece, and father of Ajax and Teucer, after whom the minor planets 1404 Ajax and 2797 Teucer are named.

Telamon banished his son Teucer (as he had been banished by his own father) when he returned home from the Trojan war without the remains of his brother. The official  was published by the Minor Planet Center on 15 February 1970.

References

External links 
 Asteroid Lightcurve Database (LCDB), query form (info )
 Dictionary of Minor Planet Names, Google books
 Discovery Circumstances: Numbered Minor Planets (1)-(5000) – Minor Planet Center
 
 

001749
Discoveries by Karl Wilhelm Reinmuth
Named minor planets
19490923